Oriole was a provincial electoral district in North York, Ontario, Canada. It was created from York Mills riding in 1975 and merged into Willowdale and Don Valley East ridings after 1999.

There were three members who represented this riding during its history, most notably Elinor Caplan and her son David Caplan, both of whom held cabinet posts during their incumbency.

Members of Provincial Parliament

Election results

References

Notes

Citations

Former provincial electoral districts of Ontario
Provincial electoral districts of Toronto